Darani-ye Olya (also Romanized as Dārānī-ye ‘Olyā; also known as Dārānī and Dārānī-ye Bālā) is a village in Hayaquq-e Nabi Rural District, in the Central District of Tuyserkan County, Hamadan Province, Iran. At the 2006 census, its population was 646, in 142 families.

References 

Populated places in Tuyserkan County